James Allen (May 5, 1843 – August 31, 1913) was an Irish-born Union Army soldier during the American Civil War. He earned the Medal of Honor for bravery at the Battle of South Mountain on September 14, 1862, during the Maryland Campaign.

On April 24, 1861, shortly after the outbreak of the American Civil War, James Allen enlisted in Company F of the 16th New York Infantry.

He earned the Medal of Honor for gallantry in action at the Battle of South Mountain on September 14, 1862.  During the battle, Allen singlehandedly captured 14 Confederate soldiers of the 16th Georgia Infantry, who had mistakenly believed they were opposed by a superior force.  Allen also captured a Confederate flag in this action.

Allen was discharged along with the rest of the 16th New York in May 1863, but continued to serve the Union cause as a member of the railroad service.

Allen was awarded the Medal of Honor on September 11, 1890.

After the war, Allen lived in St. Paul, Minnesota and was a member of the Garfield Post of the Grand Army of the Republic.

Allen died on August 31, 1913, and was laid to rest in the Oakland Cemetery in St. Paul.

Medal of Honor citation
Rank and organization: Private, Company F, 16th New York Infantry.
Place and date: At South Mountain, Maryland, September 14, 1862.
Entered service at: Potsdam, New York
Born: May 6, 1843, Ireland.
Date of issue: September 11, 1890.

Citation:
Single-handed and slightly wounded he accosted a squad of 14 Confederate soldiers bearing the colors of the 16th Georgia Infantry (C.S.A.). By an imaginary ruse he secured their surrender and kept them at bay when the regimental commander discovered him and rode away for assistance.

See also
List of Medal of Honor recipients
List of American Civil War Medal of Honor recipients: A–F

References

1843 births
1913 deaths
Irish emigrants to the United States (before 1923)
19th-century Irish people
Irish soldiers in the United States Army
Union Army soldiers
People of New York (state) in the American Civil War
United States Army Medal of Honor recipients
Irish-born Medal of Honor recipients
American Civil War recipients of the Medal of Honor